Otto Grün was a German mathematician. He was known for his work in the theory of finite groups. He was born on June 26, 1888, in Berlin. He died in October 1974 on or before the 10th.

References

Bibliography

20th-century German mathematicians